The Baroness Gertrud von Le Fort (full name Gertrud Auguste Lina Elsbeth Mathilde Petrea Freiin von Le Fort; 11 October 1876 – 1 November 1971) was a German writer of novels, poems and essays.

Life
Le Fort was born in the city of Minden, in the former Province of Westphalia, then the Kingdom of Prussia within the German Empire. She was the daughter of a colonel in the Prussian Army, who was of Swiss Huguenot descent. She was educated as a young girl in Hildesheim, and went on to study at universities at Heidelberg, Marburg and Berlin. She made her home in Bavaria in 1918, living in Baierbrunn until 1939.

Despite publishing some minor works previously, Le Fort's writing career really began with the publication in 1925 of the posthumous work Glaubenslehre by her mentor, Ernst Troeltsch, a major scholar in the field of the philosophy of religion, which she had edited. She converted to Roman Catholicism the following year. Most of her writings came after this conversion, and they were marked by the issue of the struggle between faith and conscience.

In 1931, Le Fort published the novella, Die Letzte am Schafott (The Last at the Scaffold), based on the 1794 execution of the Carmelite Martyrs of Compiègne.  An English translation, titled The Song at the Scaffold, appeared in 1933.  In 1947, Georges Bernanos wrote film dialogue to a proposed cinema scenario by Philippe Agostini based on Le Fort's novella, but the screenplay was not filmed at the time.  Following Bernanos' death, after discussion with Bernanos' literary executor, Albert Béguin, Le Fort granted permission for publication of Bernanos' work in January 1949, and gifted her portion of the royalties due to her, as creator of the original story, over to Bernanos' widow and children.  Le Fort requested that Bernanos' work be titled differently from her own novella, and Beguin chose the new title Dialogues des Carmélites.  This formed the basic for the opera by Francis Poulenc from 1956.

Le Fort went on to publish over 20 books, comprising poems, novels and short stories. Her work gained her the accolade of being "the greatest contemporary transcendent poet". Her works are appreciated for their depth and beauty of their ideas, and for her sophisticated refinement of style. She was nominated by Hermann Hesse for the Nobel Prize in Literature, and was granted an honorary Doctorate of Theology for her contributions to the issue of faith in her works.

In 1952, Le Fort won the Gottfried-Keller Prize, an esteemed Swiss literary award.

Among her many other works, Le Fort also published a book titled Die ewige Frau (The Eternal Woman) in 1934, which appeared in paperback in English in 2010.  In this work, she countered the modernist analysis on the feminine, not with polemical argument, but with a meditation on womanhood.

In 1939 Le Fort had made her home in the town of Oberstdorf in the Bavarian Alps, and it was there that she died on 1 November 1971, aged 95.

Selected works
 Hymnen an die Kirche. Poetry; first published in Munich by Theatiner Verlag (1924). 
 Das Schweißtuch der Veronika, I. Band: Der römische Brunnen. A novel; Munich, Kösel & Pustet, now known as Kösel-Verlag (1928). 
 Der Papst aus dem Ghetto. Novel; Berlin, Transmare Verlag (1930). 
 Die Letzte am Schafott. Novella; Munich, Kösel & Pustet (1931). Translated as The Song at the Scaffold by Ignatius Press (2011).
 Die ewige Frau. Essay; Munich, Kösel & Pustet (1934). Expanded publication in 1960 with the same publisher. Expanded version translated as The Eternal Woman: The Timeless Meaning of the Feminine by Ignatius (2010).
 Die Madgeburgische Hochzeit. Novel; Leipzig, Insel Verlag (1938).
 Die Opferflamme. Short story; Leipzig, Insel (1938).
 Das Gericht des Meeres. Short story; Leipzig, Insel (1943).
 Das Schweißtuch der Veronika, II. Band: Der Kranz der Engel. Novel; Munich, Beckstein (1946)
 Die Consolata. Short story; Wiesbaden, Insel (1947).
 Die Tochter Farinatas. Collection of four short stories: Die Tochter Farinatas, Plus Ultra, Das Gericht des Meeres, and Die Consolata; Wiesbaden, Insel (1950). Plus Ultra translated under the same title in The Wife of Pilate and Other Stories by Ignatius (2015).
 Gelöschte Kerzen. Collection of two short stories: Die Verfemte and Die Unschuldigen; Munich, Ehrenwirth (1953). Translated respectively as The Ostracized Woman and The Innocents in The Innocents and Other Stories by Ignatius (2019).
 Am Tor des Himmels. Novella; Wiesbaden, Insel (1954). Translated as At the Gate of Heaven in The Wife of Pilate and Other Stories by Ignatius (2015).
 Die Frau des Pilatus. Novella; Wiesbaden, Insel (1955). Translated as The Wife of Pilate in The Wife of Pilate and Other Stories by Ignatius (2015).
 Der Turm der Beständigkeit. Novella; Wiesbaden, Insel (1957). Translated as The Tower of Constance in The Innocents and Other Stories by Ignatius (2019).
 Die letzte Begegnung. Novella; Wiesbaden, Insel (1959). Translated as The Last Meeting in The Innocents and Other Stories by Ignatius (2019).
 Die Hälfte des Lebens. Autobiography; Munich, Ehrenwirth (1965).
 Der Dom. Short story; Munich, Ehrenwirth (1968).

Quotation 
 Denn die Welt kann zwar durch die Macht des Mannes bewegt werden, gesegnet aber im eigentlichen Sinne des Wortes wird sie immer nur im Zeichen der Frau.
 Heute hat die Frauenbewegung ihre Ziele weithin erreicht – wir stehen nicht mehr ihrem Kampf, sondern dessen Resultaten gegenüber.

Literature 
Helena M. Tomko, Sacramental Realism: Gertrud von le Fort and German Catholic Literature in the Weimar Republic and Third Reich (1924–46). London: Routledge, 2007, ISBN 978-1904350361. 
"The Wife of Pilate" [de] is a 1955 novella by Gertrud von Le Fort.

References

External links

 Works in German
 

1876 births
1971 deaths
People from Minden
People from the Province of Westphalia
Converts to Roman Catholicism from Calvinism
German baronesses
Roman Catholic writers
German people of Swiss descent
Writers from North Rhine-Westphalia
German women writers
Knights Commander of the Order of Merit of the Federal Republic of Germany
Members of the Academy of Arts, Berlin
Westphalian nobility